Wladimir Troubetzkoy (10 October 1942 – 2 June 2009) was a French literary historian of Polish-Belarusian-Russian origin.

Growing up as a member of the aristocratic Russian family Troubetzkoy in exile in France, but speaking the Russian language at home, he graduated with a degree in Literature from the École normale supérieure and is a docteur d'État. He was Professor of Comparative literature at the University of Versailles (Université de Versailles-Saint-Quentin-en-Yvelines) and director of the Institute of Arts, Science, Culture and Multimedia (Institut Universitaire Professionalisant Arts, Sciences Culture et Multimédia).

Select bibliography
L'Aristocratie et le rôle de l'écrivain dans la littérature européenne de la première moitié du XIXe siècle (1989 [diss.]).
"De l'art d'accommoder les grands-mères: La Belle et le Chaperon." Littératures 24 (1991): 29-52
Le Double, études recueillies par Jean Bessière ; avec la collab. de Antonia Fonyi, 1995.
La Figure du double, textes réunis et présentés par Wladimir Troubetzkoy. Paris : Didier érudition, 1995
"Vladimir Nabokov's Despair: the reader as 'April's Fool'", Cycnos (12:2) 1995, 55–62.
L'ombre et la différence : le double en Europe. 1re éd. Paris : Presses universitaires de France, c1996
LiOtérature comparée, sous la direction de Didier Souiller avec la collaboration de Wladimir Troubetzkoy ; avec la contribution de Dominique Budor... (Collection Premier cycle) Paris : Presses universitaires de France, 1997
Saint-Pétersbourg : mythe littéraire. Paris : Presses universitaires de France, 2003.
Fratries : frères et soeurs dans la littérature et les arts, de l'Antiquité à nos jours, sous la direction de Florence Godeau et Wladimir Troubetzkoy ; ouvrage publié avec le concours du Centre national du livre et de l'Université de Versailles-St. Quentin. (Société française de littérature générale et comparée. Congrès (31 : 2002 : Université de Versailles-Saint Quentin en Yvelines). Paris : Kimé, c2003.

See also
Troubetzkoy

External links 
Bibliothèque nationale de France, catalogue search

French literary critics
Wladimir
French people of Russian descent
French people of Polish descent
French people of Belarusian descent
Academic staff of Versailles Saint-Quentin-en-Yvelines University
20th-century French historians
21st-century French historians
1942 births
2009 deaths
French male non-fiction writers